Studio X Sessions EP (2004) is an EP by Death Cab for Cutie. It was released exclusively on Apple's iTunes Music Store website.

Track listing

The E.P. consists of new versions of four songs that had all been recorded and released previously:

A new version of the Death Cab for Cutie song "Lightness" was also recorded during these sessions, and it was released on "The Sound of Settling" CD-single.

References

2004 EPs
Death Cab for Cutie albums